The U.S. state of Delaware has 20 wildlife and conservation areas, as of 2015. Each of the wildlife areas is operated and maintained by the Delaware Division of Parks and Recreation, a branch of the Department of Natural Resources and Environmental Control (DNREC). 

The state wildlife system includes over 56,000 acres of public land set aside to conserve Delaware's fish and wildlife populations. Unlike Delaware's state parks, which are geared to more general outdoor recreation, the wildlife and conservation areas are managed primarily for recreational activities such as hunting, fishing, and birding, similar to the National Wildlife Refuges operated by the U.S. Fish and Wildlife Service.

State wildlife & conservation areas

See also
Fishing in Delaware

References

Protected areas of Delaware